Savaş is a Turkish name that means "war" "battle" "fighting" "warfare" and refers to:

Given name
 Kool Savas (Savaş Yurderi) (born 1975), German rapper and hip hop artist of Turkish descent
 Savaş Ay (1954-2013), Turkish journalist
 Savaş Buldan (1964-1994), Turkish drug trafficker
 Savaş Dinçel (1942-2007), Turkish actor
 Savaş Kaya (born 1986), Turkish boxer
 Savaş Yılmaz (born 1990), Turkish professional footballer

Surname
 Emrah Savaş (born 1997), Turkish ice hockey player
 Oğuz Savaş (born 1987), Turkish basketball player

Places
 Savaş, Ergani
 Savaş, Şavşat, a village in the Şavşat district of Artvin Province, Turkey

See also
 Siyâvash, similar Persian name.

Turkish-language surnames
Turkish masculine given names